FAFC may refer to:

 Fisher Athletic F.C., an English football (soccer) club
 Forfar Albion F.C., a Scottish football (soccer) club
 Forfar Athletic F.C., a Scottish football (soccer) club
 Formic acid fuel cell
 Frickley Athletic F.C., an English football (soccer) club